The Filmfare Best Cinematography Award is given by the Filmfare magazine as part of its annual Filmfare Awards for Hindi films.

The category was first awarded in 1954.

Superlatives
Most Awards
Kamal Bose – 5 
Radhu Karmakar – 4
Jal Mistry – 4  
Santosh Sivan – 3
V. K. Murthy - 2
Binod Pradhan – 3
Fali Mistry – 2
Faredoon Irani – 2
Krishnarao Vashirda – 2
Jaywant Pathare – 2
Govind Nihalani – 2
Avik Mukhopadhyay – 2
Ravi K. Chandran – 2
Manmohan Singh – 2

Multi-Categories
 Kamal Bose, Radhu Karmakar, Fali Mistry & Jaywant Pathare won the award in both the categories—Black & White as well as Color.

List

See also 
 Filmfare Award's
 Bollywood
 Cinema of India

References

External links
 Filmfare Nominees and Winners

Cinematographer
Awards for best cinematography